Caelostomus elegans is a species of ground beetle in the subfamily Pterostichinae and tribe Cratocerini. It was first described by Straneo in 1938.

References 

elegans
Beetles described in 1938